Gran Canaria Fútbol Sala is a futsal club based in Gáldar, they play home games in Las Palmas's provincial capital due to limited seating on Gáldar municipal arena.

The club was founded in 1986 and relocated to Las Palmas in June 2013.

Club name's
Gáldar FS - (1982–2014)
Gran Canaria FS - (2014– )

Sponsors
Cohesan - (1991–1993)
Tecnasa - (1993–1994)
Comurca - (1995–1999)
Colegios Arenas - (2001–2009)
Colegios Arenas (an international bilingual school) - (2012–)

Season to season

4 seasons in Primera División
19 seasons in Segunda División
2 seasons in Segunda División B
1 seasons in Tercera División

Current squad

Notable players
 Iuliu Safar

References

External links
Official Website
Profile at LNFS.es

Futsal clubs in Spain
Sport in Gran Canaria
Futsal clubs established in 1986
1986 establishments in Spain
Sports teams in the Canary Islands